Dilip Dhawan (1955 – 15 February 2000) was an Indian film and television actor.

He started his career as a child in Sangharsh (1968), featuring Dilip Kumar, Dhawan acted in over 50 films.

Career
He acted as the hero in the movie Arvind Desai Ki Ajeeb Dastaan in 1978. He was also seen in the popular Topaz shaving blades advertisement in the early 1980s.

Best known for his role as "Guru" in the television serial Nukkad, Dhawan also acted in serials such as Janam, Deewar and Tere Mere Sapne. He was a well-known movie actor, known for mostly supporting roles (and a few major roles) in Ek Baar Kaho (1980), Albert Pinto Ko Gussa Kyon Ata Hai (1980), Sazaye Maut (1981), Saaheb (1985), Dak Bangla (1987), Hero Hiralal (1988), Swarg (1990), Izzatdaar (1990), Heena (1991), Madhosh (1994), Yash (1996), Virasat (1997), Hum Saath-Saath Hain: We Stand United (1999) and Raja Ko Rani Se Pyar Ho Gaya (2000).

He was also the producer of the movie Saath Saath, in 1982.

Personal life
He was the son of character actor Krishan Dhawan. He died on 15 February 2000, in Mumbai, at the age of 45, of a heart attack.

Filmography

Films

Television

References

Indian male film actors
Indian male television actors
Male actors in Hindi cinema
20th-century Indian male actors
1955 births
2000 deaths